Ross L. Prentice (born October 16, 1946) is a Canadian statistician known particularly for his contributions to survival analysis and statistical methods for epidemiology. He has worked at the Fred Hutchinson Cancer Research Center in 1974 and is also a professor of biostatistics at the University of Washington School of Public Health.

Prentice studied mathematics at the University of Waterloo from where he graduated in 1967, then obtained an MSc and PhD in statistics from the University of Toronto. He taught at the University of Waterloo before moving to the Fred Hutchinson Cancer Research Center in 1974.

Prentice proposed the case-cohort design in 1986. His most cited statistical paper, published in 1989, concerns a criterion for the valid use of surrogate endpoints. He was one of the leaders  of the Clinical Coordinating Center of the Women's Health Initiative from its beginning in 1993.

He received the COPSS Presidents' Award in 1986 and the R. A. Fisher Lectureship in 2008, for which the citation read:

Books

References

Living people
1946 births
Canadian statisticians
University of Washington faculty
Members of the National Academy of Medicine
Academic staff of the University of Waterloo
University of Toronto alumni
University of Waterloo alumni
Biostatisticians
American epidemiologists
Cancer epidemiologists
Fred Hutchinson Cancer Research Center people